Ronnie Henares (born February 8, 1955) is a Filipino actor, musician, comedian, producer and talent manager. He regularly appears in Pepito Manaloto as Tommy Diones.

Career
Ronnie Henares is a member of the band Midlife Crisis in the Philippines, where its repertoire consists of music from the ’70s and ’90s. He formerly worked as a manager for well-known Filipino singers such as Carol Banawa, Roselle Nava, Regine Velasquez, Lani Misalucha, Jolina Magdangal and Nanette Inventor.  Ronnie and his wife, Ida Ramos, are the owners of Primeline Management and Productions, Inc., which became the talent agency for other well-known artists such as 4th Impact. 

Ronnie Henares joined Pepito Manaloto in 2010, playing Tommy Diones, a role offered to him by Michael V.

Henares was also a manager of Cheska Garcia, Carlos Agassi,
Rica Peralejo, Dominic Ochoa, Kaye Abad, Paolo Contis, John Lloyd Cruz, Desiree del Valle, Patrick Garcia, Baron Geisler, Paula Peralejo, and Jodi Sta. Maria

Filmography

Television

References

External links 

 

1955 births
Living people
Male actors from Manila
Tagalog people
Filipino male comedians
Filipino male television actors
GMA Network personalities